The JESUS Film Project is an organization created in 1981 by Campus Crusade for Christ founder Bill Bright to distribute the 1979 film, Jesus, not only in English, but also  in many of the world's languages with the stated goal of reaching "every nation, tribe, people and tongue, helping them see and hear the story of Jesus in a language they can understand." The JESUS Film Project is also a member of the Forum of Bible Agencies International.

History
Bright wanted to bring a biblically accurate depiction of the life, ministry, and death of Jesus to the big screen, and in 1978, filming began in the Middle East with British Shakespearean actor Brian Deacon in the role of Jesus.

When the original American theatrical run of Jesus ended in 1979, Bright asked Paul Eshleman, who was involved in the production, to head the organization. Eshleman remained in the position until 2004, when Jim Green was named as the organization's executive director.

By the end of 2018, the Jesus Film was available in 1,724 languages. and was viewed nearly 375 million times. This has resulted in the JESUS film being recognized by The Guinness Book of World Records as the "Most Translated Film" in history, revealing the seriousness with which the JESUS Film Project takes their objective to share the gospel with people from every nation, tribe, and tongue.

Magdalena: Released from Shame
In 2007, the project released the movie Magdalena: Released from Shame, which utilized footage from the project's 1979 film Jesus. The movie told the story of Jesus as seen through the eyes of four different women, the Virgin Mary, Mary Magdalene, the Samaritan woman at the well, and Elizabeth. Critical reception for the movie was positive and the film is heavily utilized in missionary work. It is now available in 200 languages.

Rivka
The Jesus Film Project released three additional films in 2011: Rivka a 12 episode series, Walking with Jesus, a 5 episode series  “produced by Africans for Africans,” and an animation My Last Day.

See also
Jesus of Nazareth (miniseries) with Robert Powell as Jesus
The Gospel of John (film) with Henry Ian Cusick as Jesus
The Visual Bible: Matthew with Bruce Marchiano as Jesus

References

External links

Evangelical parachurch organizations
Christian organizations established in 1981